The Polish anti-religious campaign was initiated by the communist government in Poland which, under the doctrine of Marxism, actively advocated for the disenfranchisement of religion and planned atheisation. To this effect the regime conducted anti-religious propaganda and persecution of clergymen and monasteries. As in most other Communist countries, religion was not outlawed as such (an exception being Albania) and was permitted by the constitution, but the state attempted to achieve an atheistic society.

The Catholic Church, as the religion of most Poles, was seen as a rival competing for the citizens' allegiance by the government, which attempted to suppress it.

The Catholic Church in Poland provided strong resistance to the Communist regime and Poland itself had a long history of dissent to foreign rule. The Polish nation rallied to the Church, as had occurred in neighbouring Lithuania, which made it more difficult for the regime to impose its antireligious policies as it had in the USSR, where the populace did not hold mass solidarity with the Russian Orthodox Church. It became the strongest opponent of the regime throughout the rule of Communism in Poland, and provided a more successful resistance than had religious bodies in most other Communist states.

The Catholic Church unequivocally condemned communist ideology. This led to the antireligious activity in Poland being compelled to take a more cautious and conciliatory line than in other Communist countries, largely failing in their attempt to control or suppress the Polish Church.

Communist takeover (1944–1956)
The predecessor to the Communist government in Poland was the Polish Committee of National Liberation, which first took office in Soviet-occupied Lublin in 1944. It initially gave favourable promises to the Church in Poland, including restoration of property that the Nazis had taken and exempting Church property from agrarian reform.

The experiences in and after World War II, wherein the large Jewish minority was annihilated by the Nazis, the large German minority was forcibly expelled from the country at the end of the war, along with the loss of the eastern territories which had a significant population of Eastern Orthodox Belarusians and Ukrainians, led to Poland becoming more homogeneously Catholic than it had been.

After Soviet troops occupied Poland at the end of World War II, the Soviet-backed government enacted a gradual approach aimed at gaining control of the Catholic Church in Poland.

After the war was finished the government permitted Catholic welfare services to resume work, and the government rebuilt damaged or destroyed churches at a substantial public cost. The Catholic Church in Poland during the first few years was treated much better than most other religious bodies in the newly liberated states of Eastern Europe. This more lenient approach came as a result of Communism's lack of popularity among Poles and the difficulty the new regime had in presenting itself as the legitimate government of Poland; attacking the Church at this time, which was well supported by most Poles, was considered too risky to attempt.

General Karol Świerczewski, who had fought in the international brigade in the Spanish Civil War, was given Catholic funeral rites, Polish radio broadcast mass until 1947, and Bolesław Bierut's presidential oath in 1947 ended with the phrase 'so help me God'.

Policy of isolation
The Polish government made many concessions to the Church that antagonized Moscow; on the other hand, the campaign against the Church weakened their public support and made them dependent on the USSR. An important concession was the retention of religious instruction in schools, which was upheld from as early as 1945; at the same time, the state made manoeuvres to try to limit and eliminate such instruction through other means.

Bolesław Bierut, as part of a faction of the Polish Workers' Party (the Communist party in Poland) that favoured emulating the Soviet Union (Gomułka wanted to create a uniquely Polish system), took control in 1948 and attempted to turn Poland into a Stalinist state, wherein religion was actively discouraged in favour of Communism. This occurred during a general period of increasing control and repression in the Eastern bloc countries. The regime sought to eliminate the presence of Catholicism and religion from the culture, and to this effect it pursued a policy of isolation from the Vatican, creation of public opinion antagonistic to the Church, and provoking antagonisms within the Church itself by replacing religious leaders with others who worked with the regime. Marriage was secularized in 1945, and civil records were removed from the clergy's jurisdiction in 1949.

Polish society was prepared for the persecutions post-1945 due to its long history prior to the Bolshevik revolution of operation under the rule of regimes that were hostile to it. Underground universities taught uncensored history and ethics lessons, and many people openly attended church.

A letter by the primate of Poland on elections, instructing Catholics not to support parties that were opposed to Catholic teaching, was suppressed in 1946.

Patriot Priests
A notable feature of the antireligious campaign in Poland included "Patriot Priests" who opposed the Church hierarchy and supported Communism. They were rewarded, and even sometimes allowed to travel to Rome. Some of them had experienced prison camps; some had been chaplains to the Red Army during World War II. The bishops often let them remain at their posts, although they were commonly ostracized by the laity; these priests failed to achieve much popular support. The state supported priests who collaborated with them; the remainder of the clergy was accused of reactionary activities, lack of solidarity with the nation and conspiracy with the Vatican.

The government achieved some success in these efforts; an estimated 1,700 out of 11,000 priests in Poland had attended conferences of the "progressives" by 1955. In 1949 the President of Communist Poland, Bolesław Bierut, held a reception at the Belweder Palace in Warsaw for priests who were participating in a conference held by the Union of Fighters for Freedom and Democracy (ZBoWiD). At the conference some of the priests told Bierut that a lack of agreement between the hierarchy and the government made the work of clergy difficult. Bierut blamed this problem on the hierarchy:

the unfavourable attitude of higher Church authorities toward the People's state... In many cases one can hear from priests...words which are often simply criminal, anti-state.

Bierut gave cooperative priests privileges including vacations, financial support, tax exemption and protection from punishments under canon law (which were not forbidden by the state).

Following this conference, a Commission of Priests attached to ZBoWiD was created, which in the following year commenced publication of a bi-weekly entitled Citizen Priest (Ksiądz obywatel), superseded in the same year by Priests' Forge (Kuźnica kapłańska). They held conferences in almost all provincial capitals. Young priests were forced to enroll in special classes on Marxism, with the intention of causing a schism in the Church.

The state also attempted to penetrate the Church through the creation of several other organizations: the Polish Committee of Peace Partisans, the Catholic Social Club, and the Society of Children's Friends. The lay association, PAX, was founded under the leadership of Bolesław Piasecki, a leader of a pre-war fascist organization, and tried to remove the obligation of obedience to the hierarchy from members of the Church; this organization supported the regime's antireligious efforts, and also an anti-Semitic campaign in the late 1960s.

The ZBoWiD priests' commission supported the Peace Campaign, supported the government's protests against the remilitarization of West Germany, supported the planned economy, and said that the new constitution was fully in conformance with moral principles and Christian conscience. They gained  mass popularity by supporting Poland's retention of the western territories which had been part of Germany.

The government failed to produce a schism in the Church due to lack of popular support, so they disbanded the organization in 1955 and called on people to instead join the movement for peace partisans.

Bureau for Religious Affairs
In 1950 the Polish government created the Bureau for Religious Affairs, which had jurisdiction over personnel decisions and organisational functions.

The Main Commission of Intellectuals and Catholic Activists attached to the Peace Committee of Polish Partisans, was founded in 1950 and originally comprised members of theological faculties, representatives from the catholic university in Lublin and active Church workers. In 1950, this group participated in the second International Peace Congress in Warsaw. In 1951, this organization sponsored the first national conference of clergy and laymen representing Catholic public opinion. This organization attempted to mould public opinion and formulate principles pertaining to the behaviour of Catholics. It actively promoted the peace campaign, as well as government protests against remilitarization in West Germany and for support of holding the western territories. It criticized the Catholic Church in West Germany for allegedly being exploited for anti-Polish purposes.

Another organization, called the Catholic Social Club, supported the regime and even had representation in the Polish parliament, however, it lacked popular support. It attempted to reconcile Catholic teaching with dialectical materialism.

The Society of Children's Friends (TPD) was created by the Communist Party in 1949 to secularize the public school system, and it established kindergartens, primary schools, teachers' colleges, camps and recreation centres for youth. A principle aim of the Society was to educate the youth as atheists and supporters of the regime.  By 1950, the TPD had established more than 500 schools.  The Catholic Church actively opposed the attempts to remove religious instruction, and Church influence, from public schools, and encouraged the faithful to support the church in its opposition.  By 1956, religious education in public schools had been almost completely eliminated. The Soviet-style propaganda campaign created museums, associations and publications devoted to atheism.

The official press launched a campaign to safeguard Poland from subversion (this was in reference to the Vatican). The government conducted a propaganda campaign in the early years that depicted the Vatican and Polish hierarchy as germanophiles; the Vatican refused to change Poland's diocesan boundaries to mark the state's new territory.

The Vatican was often attacked in Polish propaganda as a negative influence on Poland, and claimed that Poland ceased to exist in the 18th century because the Vatican had weakened it. Propaganda also tried to link the Vatican with fascism, and claimed Pius XII was responsible for Franco's coup d'état in Spain as well as the Vichy regime in wartime France. Polish clergy loyal to the Vatican were also considered as fascists in the propaganda.

The Church signed an agreement with the government in 1950, after the old 1925 concordat was thrown out by the government on the grounds that the Vatican had violated it by supporting Germany in World War II (the Vatican had allowed a German bishop in Danzig to have jurisdiction over Germans living in Poland). This agreement was not approved by the Vatican. It contained some features favourable to the Church (which the government would not always observe in the following years), including the right to teach religion in schools and to allow children to receive religious instruction outside school, permitting the Catholic University of Lublin to continue operating, Catholic organizations still being permitted to exist, allowing the Catholic press to exist, allowing public worship in churches to continue, allowing pilgrimages, allowing religious processions, allowing chaplaincy work in the armed forces, allowing monastic orders to continue to function and continuing to allow the Church to conduct charity work (by contrast, many of these things had been outlawed in the neighbouring USSR). In return the state required the Church to submit to it politically and condemn Catholic activities that the state did not permit.

Communist constitution
In 1952 the new Polish constitution was created, which did not include previously given protections to religion and the position of the Church in the country was worded ambiguously enough to allow for almost any new law of the Sejm to not be in contradiction with it.

Persecutions of individuals for religion in the first few years were rare, because the state initially was concerned strictly with suppressing armed political resistance. From 1947–1953, the Catholic Church in Poland became the primary target for persecution in Communist Poland. All social and charitable organizations affiliated with the church were made illegal ('Caritas' was taken over by the government in 1950), Catholic schools were closed, crosses were removed from classrooms and hospitals, and a terror campaign was enacted against parishes and monasteries; clergy began to be arrested and put on trial (this included the notable arrest of a group of Jesuits headed by Father Tomasz Rostworowski). Many bishops were arrested or removed from their positions, with government approved administrators then taking over the dioceses; in some cases the government sent people loyal to it to "assist" the bishop in running his diocese. About 900 priests were imprisoned. Nine priests were sentenced to death in 1949; in 1950 the Bonifratres Order and the Catholic charity Caritas were put on trial (the latter trial led to the government seizure in the same year).

When the Vatican published its order excommunicating Catholics who actively supported communism in July 1949, the government called it an act of interference in Polish internal affairs and that clergy found trying to enforce the order (e.g. denying communion to excommunicated persons) would be punished by Polish law. The new law passed for this purpose in 1949 guaranteed the right of antireligious propaganda and also declared a penalty ranging from three years imprisonment to death, for those who abused the right of freedom of religious for 'purposes hostile to the system of the People's Republic'.

The already stressed relations between the Vatican and the Polish government deteriorated after that point, and the Polish government began to more actively strike the church; members of religious orders were required to register and give accounts of their activities as well as assets, and Catholic publications were more greatly suppressed.

The Minister of Justice commenting on the new legislation claimed he resented,

 the negative attitude of the hierarchy towards the People's Democracy, who during the five years of the existence of the regime, had shown not a single sign of appreciation of the achievements of the regime.... (the Church) had declined to combat capitalism, and had endeavored to undermine the enthusiasm for socialism.

Salesian schools and orphanages were closed. All Church private schools were closed by 1950; this was accomplished by the authorities simply refusing to grant work permits to the Catholic schools that applied for them (as religious instruction was still officially permitted, these means were instead used to eliminate Catholic education). Government-run private schools, of course, did not possess religious instruction; despite the provision in the 1950 agreement permitting religious instruction in schools, this right was being eroded. Marxism became an obligatory subject in the school system. Priests were dismissed from instructor positions for refusing to sign the Stockholm Peace Appeal, and nuns were barred from teaching in public schools, thereby leading to a common situation where other teachers were not available to give religious instruction; in some places the religious instruction was taken away on account of alleged demands of parents. By 1955 the only Catholic institution of higher learning still existent in Poland was the Catholic University of Lublin, which was being slowly liquidated by the regime. A total of 59 seminaries were closed between 1952–1956 and restrictions were imposed on training new priests. The Rozanystok seminary, which was created in 1949, was brutally liquidated in 1954. It had been moved from Wilno and had been run by Salesians for training candidates for the priesthood as well as for giving Catholic education for boys. The seminary was situated in Eastern Poland, it employed former residents of the territory annexed by the USSR in 1939, and it had arisen great concern to the government, provoking its brutal closure.

In 1950, all Church property was nationalized without compensation, except that which was used by parish priests for their own subsistence (but such land could not exceed , and any income from such land had to be used religious and charitable purposes). This nationalization was accompanied by a promise from the state that it would set aside resources for the upkeep of parishes and clergy. The Church did not provide much resistance to this confiscation, thereby denying the communists the opportunity to attack the Church as an institution chiefly concerned with protecting its property (as Lenin had attempted with the Russian Orthodox Church). The government's confiscation led to the Church becoming even more popular among the lower classes.

Two priests who were sentenced in 1951 for being part of an underground organization opposed to the state provided ammunition for a new campaign in which the government began liquidating the temporary ecclesiastical administration in the western (former German) territories and removed apostolic administrators from these areas. The Vatican began to appoint Polish bishops to these bishoprics after this point.

In May 1951 the clergy and government signed the "National Charter for Peace Plebiscite", following which subsequent trials were conducted, including notably against the Jesuit Order and St Bernard Order (leading to two death sentences). Three Salesian bishops, who were under heavy fire in the official propaganda, disappeared in 1952; in the same year several priests in Kraków were arrested on charges of espionage and sabotage. In January 1953, five dignitaries, including Archbishop Baziak in Kraków were arrested; public protests in Kraków were suppressed with violence.

In February 1953, four priests and three laymen were charged with espionage and put on trial. The government announced that, under the supposed pressure of public opinion aroused by the trial, they had to take control of the Church. Therefore, the government required all ecclesiastical posts to receive government approval. The government used this power, as well as other measures aimed at controlling the Church's activities in these years, to weaken the Church in order to aid in helping to remove it from society. Cardinal Primate of Poland, Stefan Wyszyński, attempted to manoeuvre around this obstacle by gaining permission from the Vatican to relax canonical rules in order to appoint parish administrators instead of pastors, since parish administrators were not subject to this government veto. The government claimed that it seldom used its power of veto, although Cardinal Wyszyński in his role in appointing bishops reported that he found himself largely obstructed.

Wyszyński attempted to publish a letter protesting the government's treatment of the Church, and he was secretly arrested and put under house arrest (confined to a convent) in 1953; this followed from the arrest of a number of other bishops prior to his arrest (including the primate, 11 bishops were arrested in that year) including the trial of Bishop of Kielce Kaczmarek before the military tribunal in Warsaw (on charges of espionage). After this, the free bishops agreed to cooperate with the government's decree in February. This arrest later became public knowledge; the government offered to release him in 1955 if he stepped down from resuming his post as cardinal-primate.

The state tried to take control of the Polish Orthodox Church (with a membership of about half a million) in order to use it as a weapon against the Roman Catholic Church in Poland, and it attempted to control the person who was named as Metropolitan for the Polish Orthodox Church; Metropolitan Dionizy (the post-war head of the POC) was arrested and retired from service after his release.

After the government's coming to power the prewar press legislation was abolished, the printing industry and plants were nationalized, and prepublication censorship was imposed. In July 1946, a government decree created the Central Office For Control of the Press, Publications and Public Performances under which all press and printing activities were controlled. Poland's vast and diverse Catholic press network from the pre-communist era was mostly eradicated, with the exception of some publications that continued to exist under heavy censorship, a reduction of their circulation and a requirement to only speak on purely religious matters (as opposed to political or social). Catholic publications that still existed included Tygodnik Warszawski (which was defiant to the regime and closed in 1949), Tygodnik Powszechny (whose editors resigned under pressure in 1953 after they failed to produce a correct obituary for Stalin, and pro-regime Catholics took over, but its old editors returned in 1956), and Dziś i Jutro (a publication that attempted to promote coexistence of Catholicism and communism). This was a liberty that was not allowed to other places in the Soviet bloc (including the USSR most notably, which had banned church publications in 1929). The founders of Tygodnik Warszawski were incarcerated, of which Father Zygmunt Kaczyński and Antoni Antczak both died in prison. Cardinal Wyszyński attempted to intervene on behalf of Father Zygmunt.

Following with the forcible conversion of Eastern Catholics in the USSR to Orthodoxy, the Polish government called on the Orthodox church in Poland to assume 'pastoral care' of the eastern Catholics in Poland. After the removal of Metropolitan Dionizy from leadership of the Polish Orthodox Church, Metropolitan Macarius was placed in charge. He was from western Ukraine (previously eastern Poland) and who had been instrumental in the compulsory conversion of eastern Catholics to orthodoxy there. Polish security forces assisted him in suppressing resistance in his taking control of Eastern Catholic parishes. Many eastern Catholics who remained in Poland after the postwar border adjustments were resettled in Western Poland in the newly acquired territories from Germany. The state in Poland gave the POC a greater number of privileges than the Roman Catholic Church in Poland; the state even gave money to this Church, although it often defaulted on promised payments, leading to a perpetual financial crisis for the POC.

Period of political thaw (1956–1970)
A period of de-stalinization occurring in the 1950s in the Eastern Bloc, as well as the recognition of the problems Communism was facing when faced with the unique situation in Poland, led to Władysław Gomułka returning to power (he had earlier been the leader before he was replaced by Bierut in 1948). The state lightened its restrictions on the eastern Catholic churches which began to grow back, partly with assistance from the rest of the Catholics. The state moved away from its attempt to control and manipulate the Church for state purposes, as it had earlier planned in its first years of existence, and moved more towards a strategy of combatting it through legislation and force.

During the events of the October revolution in 1956, the government was criticized by parts of the secular press and the loyalty of the Catholic press during these days, was returned in favour by Gomułka who lifted some restrictions placed on it. Cardinal Wyszyński and other bishops were released from prison, five Catholic deputies were allowed to enter the Sejm, and monks and nuns were allowed to return to their monasteries. A new agreement was formed between the government and the Church, which resolved to remove previous anti-religious measures and once again renewed the Church's allegiance to the state. This was reneged, however, when within a few years Gomułka tightened his control and began restricting the Catholic press again. The Catholic press was then made incapable of responding to arguments against the Church in the secular press.

In 1957, Cardinal Wyszyński attempted to publish a Vatican decree condemning Catholics who collaborated with the government, but he was prevented by censorship. The Church also was unable to voice any opposition to birth control or abortion in its press.

Abortion had initially remained restricted (as it had been in the prewar period, and for most of Poland's history), but was legalized in 1956 and further executive provisions were passed in 1959 that broadened access to abortions.  The state also encouraged women to take a more active role in the paid labour force and in social life, partly as an attempt to undermine Church attitudes about a woman's role in family life.

Catholic education came back to some extent in public schools after 1956, but was no longer compulsory (before when it was compulsory, school authorities usually did not make it compulsory) and only existed in schools where a majority of parents requested it, and it was regarded as an extracurricular activity outside of class hours; just as before, however, the state immediately took measures aimed at eroding this concession. All members of religious orders teaching in schools had their teaching licenses suspended and many lay teachers were also suspended from teaching, thus leaving many schools without teachers of religion and other indirect means were used to eliminate the legally permitted religious instruction in public schools. Approved teachers were subject to state inspection, and the curricula needed to have state approval. As the situation progressed, however, the state came to officially legally eliminate religious instruction in 1961.

Gomułka stated during the seventh plenary sessions of the Central Committee of that year:  The school in People's Poland is a lay school. Its task is to train enlightened, superstition-free and rationally thinking citizens. The state authorities will not create obstacles for parents who want their children to receive religious education. However, in the interest . . . of all parents - believers and non-believers alike - these children should receive religious instruction outside the school.

Despite Gomułka's statement, the state also created obstacles for teaching religion outside of the schools. The government frequently declared that buildings that held religious classes were unsafe and therefore were not granted permits. The government also issued legislation to limit such instruction to no more than 2 hours per week, that the religious instructors would be made state employees (the Church told the clergy not to register and accept salary to fulfill Jesus' commandment of teaching) and that local school boards would be in control of the education. These restrictions were initially reluctantly enforced, but in 1964 new legislation allowed all such buildings for religious instruction to be inspected for hygiene by the government, which reserved the right to shut them down on such grounds. Cardinal Wyszyński protested the way this was carried out, and the government rebutted that it was only concerned with protecting students' health and safety.

Discriminatory policies were introduced against Catholics in both public and professional life.

In 1959 new tax laws were approved that limited the definition of what was included by the term 'worship' and sums given for things such as the primate's secretariat, seminaries or Catholic charities were no longer tax exempt. This led to the taxing of church donation money at the same level as private enterprise (65%). At some point, church buildings in the western territories were nationalized as post-German assets, and high rents were charged for their use.

Also in 1959, members of religious orders were no longer permitted to become parish priests or administrators, and they were also discharged from service at hospitals, public nurseries, dispensaries and kindergartens. Beginning in 1960, nuns were no longer permitted to study at universities or colleges. Many members of religious orders did also not have their declarations of residence accepted by the state. They generally had their civil rights eroded as the state discriminated against them.

The antireligious propaganda failed to find much popularity among the Polish masses. Despite the pressure placed on the church, the number of priests leaving seminaries actually attained higher levels in the 1950s than it had been in the pre-war years.

From the 1960s onward Poland developed an increasingly vocal Catholic intelligentsia and an active movement of young Catholics. The "Oasis" movement, was created in the 1960s by Father Franciszek Blachniki, and it consisted of Church activities including pilgrimages, retreats and various ecumenical endeavours. Intense efforts by the state to undermine it failed.

During Pope John XXIII's pontificate, the regime successfully bypassed the Polish episcopate by being allowed to directly negotiate with the Vatican, which allowed the government to isolate the Polish episcopate. When Paul VI succeeded him, the new pope required further negotiations to go through the Polish episcopate.

In 1965, on the eve of Poland's 1000 year anniversary of its conversion to Christianity, the Polish episcopate made preparation for the event by inviting foreign guests including Pope Paul VI. In its letter to the German bishops, it controversially asked to forget about the past, grant forgiveness to Germans for occurrences during World War II and also asked for Poles to be forgiven for these occurrences too, and stated the Poland had been a bulwark of Christianity; the state took issue with the contents of the letter and it had not been cleared with the state when it was sent. It was declared opposed to the interests of Polish foreign policy. Gomułka stated that declaring Poland as the bulwark of Christianity was at odds with Poland's relationship with the Soviet Union and struck at the foundations of Poland's foreign policy.

In the midst of this crisis, the Polish episcopate was also criticized in the press for making no progressive contribution to the Second Vatican Council and Cardinal Wyszyński was reproached for supposedly calling "for the condemnation of atheism, the preservation of the
old, anti-socialist and pro-fascist social doctrine of the Church in all spheres of social life. "

To punish the Church for its behaviour, several seminaries were closed and seminarians were made subject to the military draft, Wyszyński was denied privilege to travel to Rome and Paul VI was barred from coming to the Millennium celebrations. The government staged rival secular celebrations at the same time as the religious celebrations took place, in order to blunt enthusiasm in the religious celebrations.

Despite all of this (and in contrast to the USSR), the number of parishes, priests and nuns reached higher figures than it had prior to the coming of Communism. The postwar church had 20,000,000 regular communicants.

In 1968, following the student uprisings, the Church was criticized for providing moral support to anti-Polish forces on account of its speaking up for human rights.

Edward Gierek's decade in office (1970–1981)
Beginning in the early 1970s the Church moved from a defensive stance to a more aggressive stance in speaking in defence of human rights.

In 1970, Edward Gierek became the new leader of Poland, and he embarked on more relaxed policies with regard to anti-religious activity than his predecessors had. He established a personal working relationship with Stefan Wyszyński, authorized the building of new Churches and the resumption of instruction for priests in seminaries. In October 1977, he became the first Polish Communist leader to go to the Vatican and meet the pope (then Paul VI).

The security apparatus in Poland, as in other Communist nations, recruited members of the clergy. The security service used blackmail, psychological manipulation and a variety of material rewards (e.g. needed medicines for ill relatives) in order to secure the cooperation of clergy.  In a reversal, the security service and Polish government had also members in its ranks who were secretly providing beneficial information to the Church

Catholic youth were forced to enroll in Communist Youth organizations.  Unlike in the CPSU (which was staunchly atheist), believers formed the majority of the membership of the Polish United Workers' Party, wherein almost 50% of party members practiced their faith at church (statistic from 1980).

The state encouraged the migration from rural areas towards cities, partly as an attempt to weaken the Church's influence. School curricula was modified to include more Marxist-Leninist ideas, new superintendents sympathetic to the party were appointed and later afternoon classes were created to hinder children from going to receive religious instruction.

The state came to increasingly change it approach to gender relations (earlier used to strike the Church with) in the later decades when woman's role in the family became more strongly emphasized in official propaganda and legislative measures were introduced to make it harder for women to find employment.

Atheism never became widely accepted in Poland (as it had been in the USSR), and vast numbers of Poles continued to believe and even to attend Mass. Religious indifference became more common than atheism, but never achieved numbers larger than a small minority. However, at the same time, among believing Catholics, Catholic moral beliefs were eroded, with increasing numbers of people not accepting Church teaching on abortion or matrimonial/familial relations, and many Catholic Christians began thinking of morality being independent from religion as well as rejected the clergy's authority to issues directions regarding conscience.

Cardinal Primate of Poland, Stefan Wyszyński, believed that Poland had a special role to play in human history and he supported Polish nationalism as a precursor to the liberation of Eastern Europe from Soviet role. Such ideas were popular among many Polish Catholics as well. Wyszyński was brought into sharp conflict with the Communist authorities on account of this (he also experienced some conflict with the Vatican). He was very popular in Polish society, and he was defiantly referred to as 'interrex' (when Poland was an electoral monarchy, during the period when one monarch had died and before another was elected, the supreme power in the country was held by the Roman Catholic primate who was called 'interrex', this title therefore meant that there was no other legitimate government in Poland at the moment except the primate). He was both a critic of the regime and a mediator between the regime and the rest of civil society. Wyszyński provided a significant obstacle to the Communists taking control of the church in Poland; he died in 1981 and was replaced by Cardinal Józef Glemp.

After Cardinal Wojtyła of Kraków became Pope John Paul II, his election was greeted in Poland with great enthusiasm. He visited Poland from June 2–10 in 1979. During his visit he bluntly challenged Communist ideology by declaring that Christianity was the route to true human freedom (as opposed to Marxism) and called people to non-conformance. Over thirteen million people went into the streets to greet him in his visit, in direct defiance to the Polish government. Dissidents in Poland and elsewhere in Eastern Europe took great notice to this fact. Radosław Sikorski in his memoir later said: "We realized for the first time that 'we' were more numerous than 'them'."

When visiting the satellite town of Mogiła (location of the Mogiła Abbey) in Kraków, the Pope said:  Christ never wants Man to be considered merely as a means of production. . . This should be remembered by the worker and the employer, by the work system as well as by the system of remuneration. It must be remembered by the State, the nation and the Church. . . For the sake of humanity the Church would like to reach an understanding with every work system, asking only to be permitted to speak to the individual human being about Christ and to love him according to his human dignity. . . In the spirit of fraternal solidarity and on the foundation of Christ's cross I, too, have shared in the building of the huge Polish works known as 'Nowa Huta' together with you, managers, engineers, miners, labourers, minister

Within a year the independent trade union 'Solidarity' was formed, which was initially based on economic concerns, but soon became a political movement affiliated with the Church. Jerzy Urban, government spokesman claimed: "All the people's grievances against the power of the state were channelled into the Church and the election of a Pole as the Pope strengthened this religious propensity even further; when He came to Poland, I knew that this meant the end of a political epoch."

Solidarity movement and its aftermath (1981–1990)
Pope John Paul II promoted Poland's cause as well as the cause of Christians behind the Iron Curtain on an international level, to the great discomfort of the communist governments in the Warsaw pact. He rejected liberation theology, however, and kept the Church away from becoming too directly involved with politics. The church in Poland, nevertheless, played a key role in the revolution against the regime in the 1980s and provided symbols (the Black Madonna, the suffering Christ, etc.) that gave spiritual depth to the struggle against Communism; John Paul II's portrait with Mary became a popular icon in the struggle. It also provided spiritual and material comfort to striking workers, and acted as a mediator between the solidarity movement and the government.

It also held back the striking workers from excesses. The government allowed the broadcasting of Cardinal Wyszyński's sermon to the striking workers broadcast on radio and television (although the cardinal's condemnation of the propagation of atheism was censored), wherein the cardinal called on the workers to end the strike. On many occasions, the primate (both Wyszyński and Glemp), as well as the Pope, called on Solidarity to be more cooperative and reasonable, and even criticized the trade union for actions taken.

In December 1981 martial law was imposed on Poland. This caused great trouble to the church, and many were rounded up by the military. Many in the Church defended the people who were arrested. The government nevertheless found that it required the church as a mediator in the crisis; General Jaruzelski in his first address to the Sejm in 1982 stated:

 Cooperation between the state and the Catholic Church and other beliefs belongs to permanent principles. The government, enabling the fulfillment of the pastoral mission of the Catholic Church and other beliefs, preserves in accordance with the constitution, the lay character of the state. The dialogue continues. We are sincerely interested in it. Differences of opinion should not hide the supreme goal, which is for all Poles the strengthening of the sovereign state. We constantly declare readiness for constructive cooperation.

In 1982 the Joint Committee of Episcopate and Church was reactivated, and began negotiations between the state and the church on its position in Poland. As a result of these negotiations, the state gave into some church demands including an improvement of status for diocesan seminaries, exemption of seminarians from military service, increased circulation of church newspapers, the return of the organization 'Caritas' to Church control, the broadcasting of the Sunday Mass and allowing the import and uncensored distribution of L'Osservatore Romano.

The Pope held great influence in the developing crisis in Poland; the Soviet press denounced the clergy in Poland during the crisis. An unsuccessful assassination attempt was made on the pope in 1981 in St Peter's square.

The Polish Orthodox Church hierarchy, which had had their position in society strengthened since 1945, spoke out against the Solidarity movement. They refused to send delegates to meetings about human rights issues. Some exceptions occurred, such as Fr Piotr Poplawski, an Orthodox priest openly sympathetic to Solidarity who "killed himself" in 1985; several doctors asked to confirm his suicide refused to certify this as the cause of death. A Roman Catholic priest named Jerzy Popiełuszko had been murdered by the police the previous year, and the doctor who performed his autopsy was brought in and also confirmed that Fr Piotr had committed suicide.

During the government's problems with Solidarity, many parishes were used to help the grass-roots opposition to the regime, which occurred alongside growing attacks on priests by the state including brutality against priests (some of whom where murdered), breaking into churches and desecration as well as theft of religious objects.

Communist authorities blamed nationalist Catholics for fanning strife between Catholic and Orthodox populations.

In the Gdańsk accords, the Church was given permission to perform radio broadcasts. As the 80s progressed, the Church became increasingly critical of the regime and in the last years of the decade it played a critical role in the transition to democracy.

Resistance
In Poland, Lech Wałęsa, Chairman of the Solidarity movement, then President of Poland summed up the contrasting Polish view of the Soviets and of Religion (specifically Catholicism) this way:

Thus, it is clear that Polish nationalists linked their struggle against the Soviet Union with a struggle against atheism.
 
In Hungary, following the Hungarian Revolution of 1956, one of the first actions of the resistance was to retrieve imprisoned Cardinal József Mindszenty; a large crowd took him to the episcopal palace in the city, and his first free action was to celebrate mass in honor of the resistance.
 
In Czechoslovakia, the 1968 Prague Spring provided a renewed Catholic resistance to the Soviets and the Soviet-led Orthodox control of Catholic lands, churches, and institutes. This inspired Ukrainian Greek-Catholics to renew their efforts to achieve official recognition from the Soviets.

See also
 Anti-religious campaign during the Russian Civil War (1917–1921)
 League of Militant Atheists
 Persecution of Christians in Warsaw Pact countries
 Religion in Poland
 Anti-religious campaign of Communist Romania
 USSR anti-religious campaign (1921–1928)
 USSR anti-religious campaign (1928–1941)
 USSR anti-religious campaign (1958–1964)
 USSR anti-religious campaign (1970s–1987)

References

Polish People's Republic
Persecution of Christians in the Eastern Bloc
History of religion in Poland
Religious persecution by communists